Ningali may refer to:

 Ningali Cullen (1942–2012), Aboriginal activist
 Ningali Lawford (1967–2019), Australian actress